Seoul Girls' High School (서울여자고등학교) is a high school located in Yeomni-dong, Mapo district, Seoul. It was established in 1958 as Mapo Girls' High School, and took its present name in 1960. The school was divided into separate junior high and high schools in 1968.

Notable alumni

 Chae Ri-na
 Lee Hae-ri
 Lee Hye-sook
 Na Kyung-won
 Won Mi-kyung
 Bae Hae-sun

References

External links
 

Girls' schools in South Korea
High schools in Seoul
Mapo District
Educational institutions established in 1958
1958 establishments in South Korea